The 2019–20 FA Women's National League was the 28th season of the competition, and the second since a restructure and rebranding of the top four tiers of English football by The Football Association. Began in 1992, it was previously known as the FA Women's Premier League. It sits at the third and fourth levels of the women's football pyramid, below the FA Women's Championship and above the eight regional football leagues.

The league features six regional divisions: the Northern and Southern divisions at level three of the pyramid, and below those Division One North, Division One Midlands, Division One South East, and Division One South West. The league normally consists of 72 teams, divided equally into six divisions of twelve teams. At the end of the season the champions of the Northern and Southern divisions will both qualify for a Championship play-off match against each other which will decide the overall National League Champion. The divisional alignments for the forthcoming season were outlined at the National League's AGM on 16 June 2019.

On 5 June 2020, the season was curtailed and all results were expunged with no promotion or relegation as a result of the COVID-19 pandemic.

Premier Division

Northern Division 
Changes from last season:

 League champions Blackburn Rovers were promoted to the FA Women's Championship.
 Doncaster Rovers Belles were relegated to Division One Midlands.
 Bradford City were relegated to Division One North.
 Loughborough Foxes were realigned to National League North from the National League South.
 Burnley were promoted from Division One North.
 West Bromwich Albion were promoted from Division One Midlands.
 Guiseley Vixens liquidated following the close of the 2018–19 season.

League table

Results

Southern Division 
Changes from last season:

 League champions Coventry United were promoted to the FA Women's Championship.
 C & K Basildon were relegated to Division One South East.
 Loughborough Foxes were realigned to the National League North from the National League South.
 Crawley Wasps were promoted from Division One South East.
 Keynsham Town were promoted from Division One South West.
 Yeovil Town were relegated from the FA WSL after they were denied an FA Women's Championship license.
 Queens Park Rangers were renamed Hounslow after losing its affiliation to Queens Park Rangers F.C.

League table

Results

Division One

Division One North 
Changes from last season:

 League champions Burnley were promoted to the National League North.
 Bradford City were relegated from the National League North.
 Durham Cestria were promoted from the North East Regional Women's Football League Premier Division.
 Stockport County were promoted from the North West Women's Regional Football League Premier Division.
 Morecambe and Crewe Alexandra were relegated.

League table

Division One Midlands 
Changes from last season:

 League champions West Bromwich Albion were promoted to the National League North.
 Doncaster Rovers Belles were relegated from the National League North.
 Leafield Athletic were promoted from the West Midlands Regional Women's Football League Premier Division.
 Leicester United were promoted from the East Midlands Regional Women's Football League Premier Division.
 Steel City Wanderers were relegated.

League table

Division One South East 
Changes from last season:

 League champions Crawley Wasps were promoted to the National League South.
 AFC Basildon were relegated from the National League South.
 Cambridge City were promoted from Eastern Region Women's Football League.
 Kent Football United were promoted from London and South East Women's Regional Football League.
 Denham United and Luton Town were relegated.

League table

Division One South West 
Changes from last season:

 League champions Keynsham Town were promoted to the National League South.
 Exeter City were promoted from the South West Regional Women's Football League.
 Southampton FC Women were promoted from the Southern Region Women's Football League.
 St Nicholas withdrew from the league at the start of the 2018–19 season.
 Southampton Saints disbanded prior to the start of the 2019–20 season.

League table

References

External links 
 Official website of the FA Women's National League
 League results and standings

FA Women's National League seasons
2019–20 in English women's football
FA Women's National League
FA Women's National League